Geelong Grammar School is an independent Anglican co-educational boarding and day school. The school's main campus is located in Corio on the northern outskirts of Geelong, Victoria, Australia, overlooking Corio Bay and Limeburners Bay.

Established in 1855 under the auspices of the Church of England, Geelong Grammar School has a non-selective enrolment policy and currently caters for approximately 1,500 students from Pre-school to Year 12, including 800 boarders from Years 5 to 12. In 2009, the school's fees are the most expensive in Australia based on a comparison of Year 12 student fees.

Geelong Grammar School is a member of the Headmasters' and Headmistresses' Conference, the Junior School Heads Association of Australia (JSHAA), the Australian Boarding Schools' Association (ABSA), the Association of Heads of Independent Schools of Australia (AHISA), the Association of Independent Schools of Victoria (AISV), and is a founding member of the Associated Public Schools of Victoria (APSV). The school is also a member of the G20 Schools Group. The school has offered the International Baccalaureate (IB) since February 1997.

History

The school was founded in 1855 as a private diocesan school with the blessing of Bishop Perry by the Venerable Theodore Stretch, Archdeacon of Geelong, with an initial enrolment of fourteen boys. The school grew rapidly and in 1857 it was assigned £5,000 of a government grant for church schools by Bishop Perry, the foundation stone was laid for its own buildings and it was transformed into a public school. The school closed due to financial difficulties in 1860, only to reopen in 1863 with John Bracebridge Wilson, who had been a master under George Vance, as head master.

For many years Bracebridge Wilson ran the school at his own expense and through this time boarders came to compose the greater part of the student body. In 1875, James Lister Cuthbertson joined the staff as Classics master. He had a great influence upon the boys of the school and was much admired and loved by them in spite of his alcoholism. Upon the death of Bracebridge Wilson in 1895, Cuthbertson became acting head master until the appointment of Leonard Harford Lindon early in the next year.

Lindon ran the school for 15 years, but was never fully accepted by the old boys because he lacked the personal warmth with the boys that had been seen with Bracebridge Wilson and Cuthbertson. By the turn of the century the school was outgrowing its buildings in the centre of Geelong, and so it was decided to move. The school council chose to open the head mastership to new applicants. Lindon reapplied but was rejected and Francis Ernest Brown was chosen as the new head master.

In 1909, the school purchased a substantial amount of land in the then rural Geelong suburb of Belmont, bounded by Thomson, Regent and Scott Streets, and Roslyn Road. On 21 October 1910, chairman of the school, W. T. Manifold turned the first sod at the site of what was expected to be a new era for the school. These plans had faded by August 1911, when adjoining rural land was offered for sale as the Belmont Hill Estate. The school council judged that the adjacent suburban subdivision would work against their plans for a boarding school, not one catering for day boys. The decision was rapidly made to buy land on the opposite side of Geelong at Corio, and the land at Belmont was sold for further residential subdivision.

At the end of 1913 the school left its old buildings near the centre of Geelong and opened at its expansive new site at Corio in February 1914. Brown put a greater emphasis on religion than his predecessors, and the new isolated location with its own chapel was ideal for this.

Upon Brown's retirement in 1929 the school council set out to find a 40-year-old married priest as the next head master, but they ended up choosing James Ralph Darling, a 30-year-old layman and bachelor. This proved to be a most successful choice and ushered in an era of creativity and massive expansion, following the purchase in 1933, of Bostock House, the Geelong Church of England Grammar Preparatory School in Newtown, and Glamorgan Preparatory School in Toorak in 1946. Darling's boldest initiative was the starting of the Timbertop campus, in the foothills of the Victorian Alps near Mansfield, in 1953. He attracted many acclaimed in their fields to work as masters at the school, including the historian Manning Clark, the musician Sir William McKie, and the artist Ludwig Hirschfeld Mack.

Thomas Ronald Garnett succeeded Darling in 1961. He took the school down a liberal path, most notably in early steps towards co-education, with girls from Geelong Church of England Girls' Grammar School "The Hermitage" taking certain classes at Corio by the early 1970s, but also by making chapel non-compulsory; a policy later reversed. At the start of 1972, co-education was formally introduced when girls were accepted into the two senior years.

Garnett was succeeded by Charles Douglas Fisher, who continued the move towards co-education. In a staff meeting in which the votes for and against co-education were equal, he cast the deciding vote that led to the school accepting girls through all levels. In 1976, after a year of negotiations, GCEGS, GCEGGFS, "The Hermitage" and Clyde School amalgamated. Fisher died as the result of a car accident on the way to Timbertop for an end of year service in 1978.

An interregnum of two years was followed by the appointment, in 1980, of John Elliot Lewis (who later became headmaster of Eton College from 1994 to 2002). Under the leadership of Lewis the school set about renovating the boarding and day houses to bring them up to more acceptable modern standards, and there was a focus on improving academic results in addition to the generally rounded education offered. In part, this was achieved through introducing timetable flexibility to allow able later-year high-school students to undertake Victorian Certificate of Education studies ahead of their cohort. The school is now one of 43 high schools in Australia to offer the International Baccalaureate Diploma programme as an alternative to the VCE. The later years of Lewis' head mastership saw an effort (which has been largely successful) to make the school less hierarchical.

The period since Lewis has seen two head masterships of Lister Hannah and Nicholas Sampson and, in 2004, the appointment of Stephen Meek.

In 2018, after 13-and-a-half years as Principal, Stephen Meek retired from the School and was replaced by Rebecca Cody. She becomes the 12th Principal of Geelong Grammar School; the first Australian-born and first female Principal in the School's history.

Headmasters and principals

Campuses
Geelong Grammar School has four campuses:
 Corio Years 5 to 8 (Middle School) and 10 to 12 (Senior School), boarding and day.
 Bostock House Pre-school to Year 4, day.
 Toorak Campus (formerly known as Glamorgan) Pre-school to Year 6, day.
 Timbertop Year 9, Full-time boarding

The school had planned in the 1990s to open a campus in northern Thailand, but the project was cancelled following the 1997 Asian Financial Crisis, as the Thai government suspended many major projects, and also due to the collapse of the hillside site on which the campus was to be built, as the school had failed to undertake a geological survey to establish the suitability of the site. The school lost approximately $3.5 million in this planning failure.

Houses

Senior School
Allen (Day, Co-ed., 1914, originally Geelong)
Clyde (Boarding, Girls, 1976, nominal successor to Clyde School)
Cuthbertson (Boarding, Boys, 1914)
Elisabeth Murdoch (Boarding, Girls, 2009)
Francis Brown (Boarding, Boys, 1937)
Fraser (Day, Co-ed., 1976)
Garnett (Boarding, Girls, 1982)
The Hermitage (Boarding, Girls, 1976, originally Jennings, nominal successor to CEGGS "The Hermitage")
Manifold (Boarding, Boys, 1914)
Perry (Boarding, Boys, 1914)

Middle School
Parrwang (Boarding, Boys)
Kunuwurra (Boarding, Girls)
Highton (Day, Co-ed)
Otway (Day, Co-ed)

Toorak Campus
Bruce 
McComas
Alexander
Mann

Bostock House
 Austin
Morres 
School 
Volum

Buildings at Corio

Some notable buildings at Corio include:
The Handbury Centre for Wellbeing aka. The Wellbeing Centre
The Handbury Centre for Wellbeing is Geelong Grammar's main centre for sport, health and overall wellbeing. It was opened on 20 April 2008. The Centre comprises a multi purpose sports hall, a FINA-accredited 25 metre pool with diving bowl, a fitness centre, a dance studio, the John Court Café, the GGS Shop and the School's Medical Centre, Kennedy, that also has rooms for counselling services and physiotherapy.

Perry Quad
Built in 1913 and extended in the 1930s the Quad is located at the centre of the school between the Dining Hall and the chapel. It houses classrooms, school administration, the Morris Room (staff dining room), three staff residences (The Dovecote, The Eyrie, and the Vicarage), the Hawker Library, and, until 1986, Perry House. The central quadrangle is grassed and there is a fountain in its centre. It is often used for assemblies and plays. The clocktower is on the eastern side of the Perry Quad.

Hawker Library
Originally the school library, its décor dates from the 1940s. From 1979 it housed the History Library, and was in 2005 converted into the Michael Collins Persse Archives Centre. The building now houses the Institute of Positive Education.

The Cloisters
Linking the Quad and Chapel, the Cloisters are the school's main war memorial. There are plaques commemorating OGGs who died in the First and Second World Wars at either end. The ANZAC Day service is held around the Cloisters every year. Silence is to be maintained at all times in the Cloisters.

Chapel of All Saints
Built in stages between 1914 and 1929 the chapel is at the spiritual centre of the school. All students must attend a weekday service and boarders must also attend on Sundays. The 3 manual organ was originally built by Hill in 1909 and was expanded in 1958 by J. W. Walker.

Dining Hall
Built in 1913 and extended in 1933 the Dining Hall is where all Senior School students take meals. There are paintings of all former Head Masters of GGS, as well of some of the school founders, and some the Headmistresses of The Hermitage and Clyde.

Darling Hall
Built in the 1960s the Darling Hall serves as the Middle School Dining Hall and Examinations Hall. At its East end is the sanctuary that was originally in the Assembly Hall of The Hermitage.

Music School
Built in 1938 and standing out as one of the few buildings at Corio not constructed with red bricks, the Music School contains many small practice rooms, a band room, and the Music Hall, which is used for many concerts by students, staff, and visiting musicians.

Art School
Built in 1937 the Art School served as the only centre for art in the school until the construction of the Sinclaire and Hirschfeld Mack Centres in the last 5 years. It remains at the centre of art in the school, being used mostly for painting and drawing.

Fisher Library
Built in 1979 and renovated and extended in 2005 the Fisher is now Senior School's sole lending library, now incorporating the collections of the former History Library.

School for Performing Arts and Creative Education (The SPACE)

Completed in May 2015 (replacing the Bracebridge Wilson Theatre), The School for Performing Arts and Creative Education (commonly referred to as The Space), holds two spaces. The 270-seat Studio is named The Bracebridge Wilson Studio, while the larger 800-seat Forum is named The David Darling Play House. The Space is where most school plays and school assemblies are held.

Bracebridge Wilson Theatre
Opened in 1978 (replacing the 1890s Bracebridge Wilson Hall, which burnt in 1976), the "BW" was where most school plays and school assemblies were held. It seats approximately 300 people in fixed seating. However, seating capacity can be expanded to accommodate approximately 600 people. With the construction of School for Performing Arts and Creative Education, the "BW" was made largely redundant.

Cook Quad
Built in stages until the 1930s the Cook Quad houses most of the school's Science Department.

Curriculum 
Geelong Grammar offers its senior students a choice of the International Baccalaureate (IB) or the Victorian Certificate of Education (VCE).

Extracurricular activities

Sport 
Geelong Grammar is a member of the Associated Public Schools of Victoria (APS).

APS & AGSV/APS Premierships 
Geelong Grammar has won the following APS and AGSV/APS* premierships.

Boys:

 Athletics (6) - 1926, 1928, 1936, 1946, 1951, 1954
 Badminton (4) - 1999, 2000, 2001, 2004
 Cricket (8) - 1903, 1906, 1915, 1916, 1961, 1962, 1990, 2014
 Football - 1902
 Rowing (30) - 1885, 1886, 1887, 1888, 1889, 1890, 1893, 1894, 1895, 1898, 1914, 1917, 1920, 1922, 1924, 1934, 1935, 1943, 1950, 1953, 1954, 1971, 1974, 1975, 1986, 1987, 1988, 1989, 1991, 1994

Girls:

 Athletics (8) - 1985, 1986, 1987, 1988, 1990, 1991, 1992, 1993
 Badminton (3) - 2002, 2003, 2005
 Cross Country (4) - 1991, 1992, 1995, 1996
 Hockey (2) - 1993, 1994
 Netball (2) - 2012, 2018
 Rowing (23) - 1985, 1986, 1988, 1990, 1991, 1993, 1994, 1995, 1996, 1997, 1998, 2000, 2001, 2007, 2008, 2009, 2010, 2014, 2015, 2016, 2017, 2018, 2019
 Swimming (3) - 1986, 1987, 1988

School journal

The Corian is the journal of the Geelong Grammar School. Published as The Geelong Grammar School Annual (1875–76), The Geelong Grammar School Quarterly (1877–1913) and The Corian (1914–present). Published quarterly from 1877, it reverted to an annual in 1992.

Notable alumni

Former students of Geelong Grammar and old girls of The Hermitage and Clyde School are known as Old Geelong Grammarians (OGGs), and may elect to join the school's alumni association, the Old Geelong Grammarians Association. Former teachers include the German/Australian artist Ludwig Hirschfeld Mack.

In 2001, The Sun-Herald ranked Geelong Grammar School fourth in Australia's top ten boys' schools, based on the number of its male alumni mentioned in the Who's Who in Australia (a listing of notable Australians). Among the school's notable alumni are King Charles III; media mogul Rupert Murdoch; actress Portia de Rossi; John Gorton, Prime Minister of Australia 1968–1971; Mizan Zainal Abidin of Terengganu, King of Malaysia 2006–2011; Tim Macartney-Snape, mountaineer and author; billionaire businessman Kerry Packer; singer-songwriter Missy Higgins; Entrepreneur and Climate 200 Founder Simon Holmes à Court.

Sexual abuse 
Former pupils of Geelong Grammar have told an inquiry that their abuse claims were ignored for decades. The Royal Commission into Institutional Responses to Child Sexual Abuse heard evidence about five decades of complaints at the school.

In 2015, the school principal, Stephen Meek, wrote to the school community encouraging abuse victims to come forward (Letter from Stephen Meek, dated 25 May 2015, addressed to "Dear community member"). However, at the hearing of the Royal Commission, the first witness was interrogated by the school's lawyer over minor points. During that exchange, the Geelong Advertiser reported that the school lawyer was warned by the Royal Commission for referring to the ex-student by his actual name during the proceedings, in spite of the abuse victim requesting anonymity. At no point did the school lawyer take issue with the abuse claims.

One former student said he was touched on the genitals by a chaplain and then threatened with expulsion when he reported the abuse. Referred to as "BKO" by the commission, the witness described the school's Timbertop campus, where Prince Charles spent two terms in 1966, as "similar to Lord of the Flies". BKO said the school was concerned only with avoiding scandal, rather than stopping the abuse.

Local media report that another former student, described as "BKM", told the commission that Geelong Grammar should repay the fees of abuse victims. "They made my father pay an exceptional amount of money", he said. "I was sexually abused, and repeatedly and seemingly uncaring, re-exposed to the situation that allowed the abuse."

In a statement issued in August 2015, Stephen Meek said the school "absolutely condemns any form of abuse ... that has occurred at the school in the past ... I greatly regret that not all of our students received the care and support to which they were entitled". However, he had told school council meetings in 2007 that litigation regarding some of Philippe Trutmann's 41 victims had been settled for about $350,000. His report stated: "Overall, this has been a very satisfactory financial outcome for the school".

List of perpetrators
 Jonathon Harvey
 Philippe Trutmann
 John Hamilton Buckley
 John Davison (deceased)
 Graham Leslie Dennis
 Stefan Van Vurren
 Norman Smith (deceased)
 Max Guzelian (deceased)
 Andrew MacCulloch (deceased)
 David Brian Mackey

See also
 List of schools in Victoria, Australia
 Lists of schools in Australia
 List of boarding schools

References

Further reading
 
 Collins Persse, Michael, Well-Ordered Liberty, Cliffe Books, Melbourne, 1995
 Corfield, Geelong Grammarians: A biographical register, G.G.S., 1996
 Geelong Grammar School Quarterly, 1877–1913
 The Corian, 1914–

External links

Educational institutions established in 1855
Associated Public Schools of Victoria
Boarding schools in Victoria (Australia)
Schools in Geelong
International Baccalaureate schools in Australia
Member schools of the Headmasters' and Headmistresses' Conference
Junior School Heads Association of Australia Member Schools
Co-educational boarding schools
Grammar schools in Australia
1855 establishments in Australia
Geelong Grammar School